"Wretches and Kings" is a song by American rock band Linkin Park. It is the tenth track from their 2010 album, A Thousand Suns. The song was written by the band and produced by co-lead vocalist Mike Shinoda and Rick Rubin. "Wretches and Kings" was used as a promotional single and was featured as a part of the "Linkin Park Track Pack" Downloadable Content for the video game Guitar Hero: Warriors of Rock. The song was also used for the backdrop for EA's opening sequence in EA Sports MMA.

Content
In line with the album's theme, the song's theme is about rebelling against the government and those in positions of power. The song begins with a sample of the "put your bodies upon the gears" speech address given by Mario Savio, a key figure in the Berkeley Free Speech Movement, at Sproul Hall, University of California, Berkeley on December 2, 1964.
The lyrics bear some traces of a commentary on the abuses of the powerful. Shinoda's raspy vocals are meant to vocalize the anger felt by the oppressed. In the chorus, Chester's line "we the animals take control" evocates the uprising of common individuals against those in power. The first line, "steel unload, final blow", is an assumptive premonition of the coming conflict, wherein all bets are off and no regard for the consequences are given any longer.

Promotion
"Wretches and Kings" features Mario Savio's "Bodies upon the gears" or the "Operation of the Machine" speech. The promotional single was first obtainable on the band's official website and was streamed on Noisecreep. The tempo of the song was set to 90 BPM. The song was also released for the albums like A Thousand Suns+ as the live version and It's The Bootleg, Muthafuckas! Volume 3: Fire Walk With Me as a remix.

Personnel
 Chester Bennington – vocals
 Mike Shinoda – rap vocals, keyboard, sampler
 Brad Delson – electric guitar
 Dave Farrell – bass guitar, backing vocals
 Joe Hahn – turntables, samplers, backing vocals
 Rob Bourdon – drums, backing vocals, percussion
 Mario Savio – speech part ("Operation of the Machines" speech)

Remixes
A number of remixes have been done by various artists like HavocNdeeD as well as the Los Angeles rap group Get Busy Committee, the latter in co-production by Scoop DeVille, with their GBC remix appearing on Apathy's third It's the Bootleg, Muthafuckas! compilation installment It's the Bootleg, Muthafuckas! Vol. 3: Fire Walk With Me, which was released on September 11, 2012 under the simplified title of "Wretches [Remix]".

Release history

References

2010 songs
Linkin Park songs
Song recordings produced by Rick Rubin
Songs written by Mike Shinoda
Protest songs
Industrial rock songs
Songs based on actual events
Industrial hip hop songs